Pailü is one of the main forms of Classical Chinese poetry. It is a style of regulated verse (jintishi): the rules and regulations of the pailü allow for a poem composed of an unlimited series of linked couplets. The pailü form seems to have developed as part of 7th-century Tang poetry.

See also
 Classical Chinese poetry forms
 Regulated verse
 Chinese poetry
 Chinese literature

References

Davis, A. R. (Albert Richard), Editor and Introduction, The Penguin Book of Chinese Verse. (Baltimore: Penguin Books (1970).
Watson, Burton (1971). Chinese Lyricism: Shih Poetry from the Second to the Twelfth Century. New York: Columbia University Press. 
 Yip, Wai-lim  (1997). Chinese Poetry: An Anthology of Major Modes and Genres . Durham and London: Duke University Press. 

Chinese poetry forms